Michael Thomas Pearson (born 19 January 1988) is a Welsh footballer who plays for Llandudno. He was previously with Barrow in the Conference National in England, with whom he played from July 2008 until June 2013. He began his career with football league team Oldham Athletic. He plays as either a defender or midfielder.

Club career

Oldham Athletic
Pearson went through Oldham Athletic's youth system and was a part of the club's youth Championship. He made several appearances for the reserve team before being promoted to the first team. He made his first-team debut against Millwall in a 2–1 loss on 17 February 2007. In the summer of 2007, Pearson signed a one-year contract extension to remain at Boundary Park. Pearson was loaned out to Farsley Celtic of Conference National between October and December 2007. His first appearance came in a 3–0 rout of Droylsden. Though in April 2008, both Pearson and teammate Ashley Kelly were told by Oldham that they were to be released at the end of their contracts.

Pearson played a series of trial games with Barrow AFC in summer 2008, before signing for the Conference National team before the start of the 2008–09 season. He made his debut in Barrow's 3–0 victory over Oxford United. In a 2008–09 FA Cup clash with Premier League side Middlesbrough, Pearson received an injury in the 52nd minute after a challenge with Marvin Emnes, a collision which left Pearson with a double leg-break. He was ruled out for the remainder of the season, but Barrow manager Dave Bayliss assured Pearson would remain with the club. The Bluebirds lost to Middlesbrough 2–1. In March, Pearson reported that he hoped to recover in time for the 2009–10 season. In May 2011 he was offered a new contract by Barrow. Pearson became a major part of the Barrow squad, making over 150 league appearances for the club. When the club was relegated in at the end of the 2012–13 season, he moved to Airbus UK Broughton.

In 2017/18, Pearson joined Connah's Quay Nomads, making his debut in a 1-0 win over HJK Helsinki in the Europa League.

In May 2018, Pearson left Connah's Quay to join Llandudno.

International career
Pearson has represented Wales in the Under-15 and Under-16 levels of competition. In March 2010, he made his debut for the Wales semi-professional side in a 7–2 defeat to Portugal.

Honours
Barrow
FA Trophy: 2009–10

Individual
 Welsh Premier League Team of the Year: 2014–15, 2015–16

References

External links
Mike Pearson career stats at BarrowAFC.com

1988 births
Living people
Footballers from Bangor, Gwynedd
Welsh footballers
Wales youth international footballers
Wales semi-pro international footballers
Association football midfielders
Oldham Athletic A.F.C. players
Farsley Celtic A.F.C. players
Barrow A.F.C. players
English Football League players
National League (English football) players
Airbus UK Broughton F.C. players
Connah's Quay Nomads F.C. players
Cymru Premier players
Llandudno F.C. players